Bouarfa (Berber ⴱⵓⵄⴰⵔⴼⴰ) is a city in Oriental Region, northeastern Morocco and the capital of Figuig Province. According to the 2004 census, it had a population of 24,527.

References

Populated places in Figuig Province
Provincial capitals in Morocco
Municipalities of Morocco